John Beach Litel (December 30, 1892 – February 3, 1972) was an American film and television actor.

Early life 
Litel was born in Albany, Wisconsin. During World War I, he enlisted in the French Army and was twice decorated for bravery. Back in the U.S. after the war, Litel enrolled in the American Academy of Dramatic Arts and began his stage career.

Career 
His Broadway credits include Sweet Aloes (1935), Hell Freezes Over (1935), Life's Too Short (1935), Strange Gods (1932), Before Morning (1932), Lilly Turner (1932), Ladies of Creation (1931), Back Seat Drivers (1928), The Half Naked Truth (1926), The Beaten Track (1925), Thoroughbreds (1924), and Irene (1919).

In 1929, he began appearing in films. Part of the "Warner Bros. Stock Company" beginning in the 1930s, he appeared in dozens of Warner Bros. films and was in over 200 films during his entire career. He often played supporting roles such as hard-nosed cops and district attorneys. He was Nancy Drew's (Bonita Granville) attorney father, Carson Drew, in four films in 1938 and 1939. Among his other films are They Drive by Night (1940), Knute Rockne, All American (1940), They Died with Their Boots On (1941), and Scaramouche (1952). His final film role was in Nevada Smith (1966).

In the second season of the Disney series Zorro, he played the governor of California in several episodes. During 1960 and 1961, he was seen as Dan Murchison in nine episodes of the ABC western television series, Stagecoach West, starring Wayne Rogers and Robert Bray. 

He appeared in many other series as well, including the role of Captain David Rowland in the episode "Don't Get Tough with a Sailor" on the ABC/Desilu western series The Life and Legend of Wyatt Earp starring Hugh O'Brian. In the story line, Rowland, a former captain in the United States Navy, is a wealthy Arizona Territory rancher who operates his own law and private jail near the Mexican border. 

He appeared as Mr. Crenshaw in the episode "The Giant Killer" of the western series Sugarfoot.  

Litel also appeared as Bob Cummings's boss Mr. Thackery in the TV series The Bob Cummings Show in the early/mid-1950s. Cummings played Robert S. Beanblossom on the show.

Death 
Litel died at the Motion Picture & Television Country House and Hospital in Woodland Hills, Los Angeles in 1972.

Selected filmography

Always Faithful (1929, Short) as Wayne
On the Border (1930) as Dave
Wayward (1932) as Robert 'Bob' Daniels
Fugitive in the Sky (1936) as Mike Phelan - aka Roger Johnson
Give Me Liberty (1936, Short) as Patrick Henry
Black Legion (1937) as Tommy Smith
Midnight Court (1937) as Victor Shanley
Marked Woman (1937) as Gordon
Slim (1937) as Wyatt Ranstead
The Life of Emile Zola (1937) as Charpentier
Back in Circulation (1937) as Dr. Eugene Forde
Alcatraz Island (1937) as Garrett Sloane aka 'Gat' Brady
The Man Without a Country (1937, Short) as Lt. Philip Nolan
Missing Witnesses (1937) as Inspector Robedrt L. Lane
Gold is Where You Find It (1938) as Ralph Ferris
A Slight Case of Murder (1938) as Post
Jezebel (1938) as Jean La Cour
Love, Honor and Behave (1938) as Jim Blake
Over the Wall (1938) as Father Neil Connor
Little Miss Thoroughbred (1938) as Nelson 'Nails' Morgan
My Bill (1938) as John Rudlin
The Amazing Dr. Clitterhouse (1938) as Mr. Monroe, the prosecuting attorney
Valley of the Giants (1938) as Hendricks
Broadway Musketeers (1938) as Stanley 'Stan' Dowling
Nancy Drew... Detective (1938) as Carson Drew
Declaration of Independence (1938, Short) as Thomas Jefferson
Comet Over Broadway (1938) as Bill Appleton
Wings of the Navy (1939) as Commander Clark
Nancy Drew... Reporter (1939) as Carson Drew
Secret Service of the Air (1939) as Saxby
You Can't Get Away with Murder (1939) as Attorney Carey
Dodge City (1939) as Matt Cole
On Trial (1939) as Robert Strickland
Nancy Drew... Trouble Shooter (1939) as Carson Drew
Nancy Drew and the Hidden Staircase (1939) as Carson Drew
Dust Be My Destiny (1939) as Prosecutor
On Dress Parade (1939) as Col. Michael Riker
One Hour to Live (1939) as Rudolph Spain
The Return of Doctor X (1939) as Dr. Francis Flegg
A Child Is Born (1939) as Dr. Brett
The Fighting 69th (1940) as Capt. Mangan
Castle on the Hudson (1940) as Chaplain
Virginia City (1940) as Thomas Marshall
It All Came True (1940) as "Doc" Roberts
An Angel from Texas (1940) as Quigley
Flight Angels (1940) as Dr. Barclay
Men Without Souls (1940) as Reverend Thomas Storm
Murder in the Air (1940) as Saxby
Gambling on the High Seas (1940) as U.S. District Attorney
The Man Who Talked Too Much (1940) as District Attorney Dickson
They Drive by Night (1940) as Harry McNamara
Money and the Woman (1940) as Jerremy 'Jerry ' Helm, Bank Manager
Knute Rockne, All American (1940) as Committee Chairman
Father is a Prince (1940) as Dr. Mark Stone
Lady with Red Hair (1940) as Charles Bryant
Santa Fe Trail (1940) as Martin
Father's Son (1941) as William Emory
The Trial of Mary Dugan (1941) as Mr. West
The Great Mr. Nobody (1941) as John Wade
The Big Boss (1941) as Bob Dugan
Thieves Fall Out (1941) as Tim Gordon
Henry Aldrich for President (1941) as Mr. Aldrich
They Died with Their Boots On (1941) as General Phil Sheridan
Sealed Lips (1942) as Fred M. Morton / Mike Rofano
Don Winslow of the Navy (1942) as Spencer Merlin
Kid Glove Killer (1942) as Matty
Mississippi Gambler (1942) as Jim Hadley aka Francis Carvel
The Mystery of Marie Roget (1942) as Beauvais
A Desperate Chance for Ellery Queen (1942) as Norman Hadley
Henry and Dizzy (1942) as Mr. Aldrich
Men of Texas (1942) as Colonel Colbert Scott
Invisible Agent (1942) as John Gardiner
Henry Aldrich, Editor (1942) as Mr. Sam Aldrich
The Boss of Big Town (1942) as Michael Lynn
Madame Spy (1942) as Peter Rolf
Murder in Times Square (1943) as Dr. Blaine
Henry Aldrich Gets Glamour (1943) as Mr. Sam Aldrich
Crime Doctor (1943) as Emilio Caspari
Henry Aldrich Swings It (1943) as Mr. Sam Aldrich
Submarine Base (1943) as James Xavier 'Jim' Taggart
So Proudly We Hail! (1943) as Dr. Harrison
Henry Aldrich Haunts a House (1943) as Mr. Sam Aldrich
Where Are Your Children? (1943) as Judge Edmonds
Henry Aldrich, Boy Scout (1944) as Mr. Sam Aldrich
Henry Aldrich Plays Cupid (1944) as Mr. Sam Aldrich
Henry Aldrich's Little Secret (1944) as Mr. Sam Aldrich
My Buddy (1944) as Father Jim Donnelly
Murder in the Blue Room (1944) as Frank Baldrich
Faces in the Fog (1944) as Dr. Mason
Lake Placid Serenade (1944) as Walter Benda
Brewster's Millions (1945) as Swearengen Jones
Salome, Where She Danced (1945) as Gen. Lee
Crime Doctor's Warning (1945) as Inspector Dawes
The Crimson Canary (1945) as Roger Quinn
Northwest Trail (1945) as Sergeant Means
The Daltons Ride Again (1945) as Mitchael J. 'Mike' Bohannon
The Enchanted Forest (1945) as Ed Henderson
San Antonio (1945) as Charlie Bell
The Madonna's Secret (1946) as Police Lt. Roberts
Smooth as Silk (1946) as Stephen Elliott
Night in Paradise (1946) as Archon
She Wrote the Book (1946) as Dean Fowler
The Return of Rusty (1946) as Hugh Mitchell
Sister Kenny (1946) as Medical Director
Swell Guy (1946) as Arthur Tyler
Lighthouse (1947) as Hank Armitage
Easy Come, Easy Go (1947) as Tom Clancy
The Beginning or the End (1947) as K.T. Keller
The Guilty (1947) as Alex Tremholt
Heaven Only Knows (1947) as Reverend Wainwright
Christmas Eve (1947) as Joe Bland, FBI Agent
Cass Timberlane (1947) as Webb Wargate
 My Dog Rusty (1948) as Hugh Mitchell
Smart Woman (1948) as Clark
I, Jane Doe (1948) as Horton
Key Largo (1948) as Dispatcher (uncredited)
Pitfall (1948) as District Attorney
Triple Threat (1948) as Coach Snyder
 Rusty Leads the Way (1948) as Hugh Mitchell
The Valiant Hombre (1948) as Lon Lansdell
 Rusty Saves a Life (1949) as Hugh Mitchell
 Shamrock Hill  (1949)  as Ralph Judson
Outpost in Morocco (1949) as Col. Pascal
The Gal Who Took the West (1949) as Colonel Logan
Rusty's Birthday (1949) as Hugh Mitchell
Mary Ryan, Detective (1949) as Police Captain Billings
The Sundowners (1950) as John Gall
Woman in Hiding (1950) as John Chandler
Kiss Tomorrow Goodbye (1950) as Police Chief Sam Tolgate
The Fuller Brush Girl (1950) as Mr. Watkins
Cuban Fireball (1951) as Pomeroy Sr.
The Groom Wore Spurs (1951) as Uncle George
The Texas Rangers (1951) as Texas Ranger Major John B. Jones
Take Care of My Little Girl (1951) as John Erickson (uncredited)
Little Egypt (1951) as Shuster
Two-Dollar Bettor (1951) as John Hewitt
Flight to Mars (1951) as Dr. Lane
Jet Job (1952) as Sam Bentley
Scaramouche (1952) as Dr. Dubuque
Montana Belle (1952) as Matt Towner
 Jack Slade (1953) as Judge Davidson
Sitting Bull (1954) as Gen. Wilford Howell
Double Jeopardy (1955) as Emmett Devery
The Kentuckian (1955) as Pleasant Tuesday Babson
Texas Lady (1955) as Meade Moore
The Wild Dakotas (1956) as Morgan Wheeler
Comanche (1956) as Gen. Nelson A. Miles
Runaway Daughters (1956) as George Barton
The Hired Gun (1957) as Mace Beldon
Decision at Sundown (1957) as Charles Summerton
Houseboat (1958) as Mr. William Farnsworth
The Restless Gun (1958) Episode "A Bell for Santo Domingo"
Voyage to the Bottom of the Sea (1961) as Vice-Adm. B.J. Crawford
Pocketful of Miracles (1961) as Police Inspector McCrary
Lover Come Back (1961) as Williams, Ad Council Board Member (uncredited)
The Gun Hawk (1963) as Drunk - Madden's father
The Sons of Katie Elder (1965) as Minister
Nevada Smith (1966) as Doctor

Selected television

References

External links

 
 
 

1892 births
1972 deaths
American male film actors
American male stage actors
French military personnel of World War I
People from Green County, Wisconsin
Male actors from Wisconsin
People from Los Angeles
20th-century American male actors
French Army personnel